Below is a list of ships responsible for bombarding targets at Utah Beach as part of the Normandy landings on June 6, 1944, the opening day of Operation Overlord. This force, code-named "Bombardment Group A", and commanded by Rear Admiral Morton Deyo, was a group of eighteen warships assigned to support the amphibious landings on Utah Beach on June 6, 1944 ("D-Day"); this was the opening day of Operation Overlord, the Allied operation that launched the successful invasion of German-occupied western Europe during World War II.

It was part of US Navy Force U, which consisted of 865 ships under Rear Admiral Don P. Moon. This was in turn part of the Western Naval Task Force, under Admiral Alan G Kirk.

Citations

Sources
 
 

Force U Bombardment Group
Utah Bombardment Group
Force U Bombardment Group